is a Japanese light novel series written by Hikaru Sugii and illustrated by Yū Akinashi. The series is published by ASCII Media Works, under their Dengeki Bunko imprint, since May 2020, with five volumes released as of August 2022. A manga adaptation, illustrated by Akisato Shino, started in Media Factory's Monthly Comic Alive in March 2022.

Media

Light novel
Written by Hikaru Sugii and illustrated by Yū Akinashi, the series was first published on the web novel platform  on May 1, 2020; the first volume was released on May 9 of the same year. As of August 10, 2022, five volumes have been released.

Manga
A manga adaptation, illustrated by Akisato Shino, started in Media Factory's Monthly Comic Alive on March 26, 2022. The first volume was released on September 22, 2022.

Reception
The series placed fourth on Takarajimasha's 2021 Kono Light Novel ga Sugoi! New Work category, and placed sixth in the bunkobon category.

References

External links
  

2020 Japanese novels
Anime and manga based on light novels
Coming-of-age anime and manga
Cross-dressing in anime and manga
Cross-dressing in literature
Dengeki Bunko
Light novels
Light novels first published online
Media Factory manga
Romantic comedy anime and manga
Seinen manga